Subulites is a genus of fossil sea snails, mud-dwelling marine gastropod mollusks known from the early-middle Ordovician, apparently allied with the Caenogastropoda.

References

Ordovician molluscs
Caenogastropoda
Gastropod genera
Early Ordovician first appearances
Middle Ordovician extinctions
Fossils of Georgia (U.S. state)
Paleozoic life of Ontario
Verulam Formation
Paleozoic life of Newfoundland and Labrador
Paleozoic life of the Northwest Territories
Paleozoic life of Quebec